A brigand is a person who practices brigandage

The term brigand or brigands may also refer to:

 outlaw
 Brigands (film), 1996
 The Brigand (film), 1952 
 The Brigand – A Romance of the Reign of Don Carlos, by Alexandre Dumas 
 Bristol Brigand, airplane
 Bristol Brigand, British car manufactured from 1982 to 1994, version of the Bristol Type 603
 The Brigands (band)
 The Brigands, English title of Les brigands, operetta by Jacques Offenbach

See also
Brigant, surname